Basseliniinae is a subtribe of plants in the family Arecaceae.

Genera:
Basselinia
Burretiokentia
Cyphophoenix
Cyphosperma
Lepidorrhachis
Physokentia

References

 
Arecaceae subtribes